
Gmina Biały Bór is an urban-rural gmina (administrative district) in Szczecinek County, West Pomeranian Voivodeship, in north-western Poland.

Villages
Apart from the town of Biały Bór, Gmina Biały Bór contains the villages and settlements of Bagniewko, Biała, Białka, Biały Dwór, Bielica, Biskupice, Biskupice-Kolonia, Błogowo, Borzęcino, Brzeźnica, Cieszęcino, Cybulin, Dalkowo, Dołgie, Domaradz, Donimierz, Drzonowo, Dyminek, Grabowo, Jawory, Kaliska, Kamienna, Kazimierz, Kierzkowo, Koleśnik, Kołtki, Kosobudy, Linowo, Lubiesz, Miłkowo, Miłobądz, Ponikwa, Przybrda, Radzewo, Rosłonki, Rzyszczewko, Sępolno Małe, Sępolno Wielkie, Stępień, Stepno, Świerszczewo, Trzebiele, and Zduny.

Neighbouring gminas
Gmina Biały Bór is bordered by the gminas of Bobolice, Koczała, Miastko, Polanów, Rzeczenica, and Szczecinek.

References
Polish official population figures 2006

Bialy Bor
Szczecinek County